Sreto Ristić (born 7 February 1976) is a German retired footballer and current coach of Hallescher FC. He holds Serbian citizenship. He moved to Germany at young age and has spent almost all his football career in Germany.

Coaching career
In October 2013, Ristić was hired as assistant coach for Stuttgarter Kickers. He left the position on 4 November 2015. On 20 May 2016, Ristić joined Preußen Münster as assistant manager.

Ahead of the 2017–18 season, Ristić was hired as assistant manager at Chemnitzer FC. In January 2018, he was appointed caretaker manager. It lasted for four days before a new manager was appointed. On 4 September 2019, he was appointed caretaker manager once again, before Patrick Glöckner replaced him 18 days later.

In December 2020 it was announced that he would be the manager of Kickers Offenbach from 1 January 2021. After leaving Offenbach in summer of 2022, he was appointed as the new coach of Hallescher FC in February 2023.

References

External links

1976 births
German footballers
Living people
SSV Reutlingen 05 players
1. FC Union Berlin players
VfB Stuttgart players
Serbian expatriate sportspeople in China
VfB Stuttgart II players
SSV Ulm 1846 players
SV Sandhausen players
Grasshopper Club Zürich players
Eintracht Braunschweig players
Expatriate footballers in Germany
German people of Serbian descent
Footballers from Zagreb
Serbs of Croatia
German expatriate sportspeople in China
China League One players
Guangzhou F.C. players
Expatriate footballers in China
Expatriate footballers in Switzerland
German expatriate sportspeople in Switzerland
Bundesliga players
2. Bundesliga players
3. Liga players
Swiss Super League players
Chemnitzer FC managers
Hallescher FC managers
3. Liga managers
Association football forwards
German football managers
Yugoslav emigrants to West Germany
West German footballers